The 7th Japan Record Award was held on December 25, 1965.

Emcee
Ayuurou Miki

Award Winners
Japan Record Award
 Hibari Misora for "Yawara" 
 Lyricist: Shinichi Sekizawa
 Composer: Koga Masao
 Arranger: Ryou Saeki
 Record Company: Nippon Columbia

Vocalist Award
Fubuki Koshiji for "One Rainy Night In Tokyo"

New Artist Award
Barb Satake for "Onna Gokoro No Uta"
Miyoko Tashiro for "Aishite Aishite Aishichattanoyo"

Composer Award
Hirooki Ogawa for "Sayonara Wa Dance No Ato Ni"
Singer: Chieko Baisho

Arranger Award
Kiyoshi Yamaya for "Noche De Tokyo"
Singer: Katsuko Kanai

Lyricist Award
Kazumi Yasui for "Oshaberina Shinju"
Singer: Yukari Itou

Special Award
Taro Shoji 

Planning Award
JVC for "Yukio Hashi and Rhythm Songs"

Children's Song Award
Fusako Amachi and Otowa Yurikago Kai for "Marching March"

Nominations

JRA

Vocalist Award

New Artist Award
Male

Female

References

Japan Record Awards
1965